Casting the Stones is the eighth studio album released by American power metal band Jag Panzer, released in 2004.  It shares musical similarities with the band's last album, Mechanized Warfare. This is the last album to feature Chris Broderick on guitar.

Songs

Album line-up
Harry Conklin - Vocals
Mark Briody - Guitar
Chris Broderick - Guitar
John Tetley - Bass guitar
Rikard Stjernquist - Drums

References

2004 albums
Jag Panzer albums
Century Media Records albums